A Meditation Upon a Broomstick is a satire and parody written by Jonathan Swift in 1701. Edmund Curll, in an attempt to antagonize and siphon off money from Swift, published it in 1710 from a manuscript stolen from Swift (which forced Swift to publish a corrected and authorized version that he also had to write from memory), but the satire's origins lie in Swift's time at Moor Park, Surrey, when he acted as Secretary to William Temple. While in the household, Swift would read passages from Robert Boyle's Occasional Reflections upon Several Subjects (1665) for the young Esther Johnson ("Stella" to Swift).

Boyle's Reflections took the form of meditations on everyday subjects, where they were likened to religious themes. Boyle would consider a fire, or house cleaning, and see in it a reflection of God's relationship to man, or man to his soul. These reflections were very popular in the Temple household. One day, Swift, being bored with the predictability of Boyle's points, wrote his own Meditation and put it into the book. When the time came to read for the day, he read, instead of Boyle, his own Meditation Upon a Broomstick. The ladies of the house did not catch on until near the end of the meditation that it was absurd. Swift later wrote up the Meditation in a more formal manner and published it to counteract Curll's piracy.  

To get a flavor of the Meditation, consider the last paragraph:

The Meditation begins with a rational moral comparison and proceeds to a frenzy of increasingly unlikely comparisons. While the satire begins with a pitch-perfect imitation of the kindly Boyle's tone, it ends in a frantic, misanthropic and misogynistic note of despair and nihilism. Also, while it begins with a hopeful call to self-examination, it moves eventually into a condemnation of all efforts at improvement.

External links
 

Satirical books
1701 books
1710 books
Works by Jonathan Swift